Aleks Sats (or Aleksander Sats; born on 21 August 1914 Mariinsk, Tomsk Governorate – 15 May 1992 Viljandi) was an Estonian director and actor.

In 1937 he graduated from Tartu Stage Art Studio. 1944-1952 he was the chief of Ugala Theatre; 1952-1971 its principal stage manager, and 1971-1979 he worked there as a director.

Awards:
 1958: Estonian SSR merited art personnel
 1964: Estonian SSR merited people's artist

Productions of plays

 Chekhov's "Kosjas" (1945)
 Ostrovski's "Mets" (1949)
 Sobko's "Teise rinde taga" (1950)

References

1914 births
1992 deaths
Estonian male stage actors
20th-century Estonian male actors
Estonian theatre directors
Soviet male actors
Soviet theatre directors